The Centre de Sociologie de l'Innovation (CSI; "Center for the Sociology of Innovation") is a research center at the Mines ParisTech, France.

The CSI was created in 1967 and is known for its members' contributions to the field of science and technology studies and to actor–network theory. Prominent past and current members include academics such as Bruno Latour and Michel Callon.

References

External links
 Centre de Sociologie de l'Innovation

Science and technology studies
ParisTech
Actor-network theory
Educational institutions established in 1967
1967 establishments in France